Kensington and Chelsea Register Office is an office for the registration of births, deaths, marriages and civil partnerships located in Chelsea Old Town Hall in Chelsea, London. It has hosted the weddings of many notable people.

According to The Independent, it is "still one of the hippest places to get married".

Notable people married there
Neil Aspinall, music industry executive and Suzy Ornstein (1968)
Lionel Blair, dancer and Susan Davis (1967)
Marc Bolan, singer and June Child (1970)
Pierce Brosnan, actor and Cassandra Harris, actress (1980)
Nigel Dempster, journalist, and Lady Camilla Osborne (1977)
Judy Garland, actress and Mickey Deans (1969)
Hugh Grant, actor and Anna Eberstein (2018)
James Joyce, author and Nora Barnacle (1933)
Patsy Kensit, actress and Jim Kerr, musician, (1992)
Bobby Moore, footballer and Stephanie Parlane (1991)
Prince Pavlos of Greece and Marie-Chantal Miller (1995)
Irving Penn, American photographer, and Lisa Fonssagrives, Swedish fashion model (1950)
Beth Rogan, actress and Tony Samuel, Shell oil heir and publisher (1962)
Wallis Simpson, socialite and Ernest Simpson (1928)
Sharon Tate, actress and Roman Polanski, film director (1968)
Tracey Thorn and Ben Watt, pop musicians (2008)
Marco Pierre White, chef and Alex McArthur (1988)

References

Chelsea, London
Marriage, unions and partnerships in England
Local government in London